Sharan Strange (born 1959) is an African-American poet, activist, and professor.

Life
She grew up in Orangeburg, South Carolina. She was educated at Harvard College, and received an MFA in Poetry from Sarah Lawrence College.

She served as a contributing and advisory editor of Callaloo, and co-founder of the Dark Room Collective (1988-1998) and co-curator of the Dark Room Reading Series. The Dark Room Collective had a mission of forming a community of new African-American writers. Strange can be quoted as saying: "It was the sustaining practice of writing in community just as much as the activism of building a community-based reading series for writers of color that kept us engaged in collectivity."

Strange has been a writer-in-residence at Fisk University, Spelman College, Wheaton College, the University of North Carolina-Wilmington, the University of California at Davis, California Institute of the Arts, and Georgia Institute of Technology.  She currently teaches writing at Spelman College.

Her work has appeared in journals such as Callaloo, The American Poetry Review, Painted Bride Quarterly, Beltway Poetry Quarterly, Agenda, AGNI, Mosaic, and L-I-N-K-E-D, and in numerous anthologies.

Awards

1998 D.C. Commission on the Arts and Humanities Artist Award 
 2000 Barnard Women Poets Prize, for Ash, selected by Sonia Sanchez
 2004 Rona Jaffe Foundation Writers' Award
 2009 Pushcart Prize nomination

Works
 
 "In Praise of the Young and Black"; "Their Voices Drawing Her", L-I-N-K-E-D:The Online Journal
 "Unforgettable", Poet's Moment, NPR
 "Hunger", AGNI 56, 2002

Anthologies
Including:

References

External links
 Strange reads "Unforgettable" on NPR (May 20, 2005)

1959 births
Living people
Harvard College alumni
Sarah Lawrence College alumni
American women poets
Rona Jaffe Foundation Writers' Award winners
21st-century American women